Kokanee is a word from the Okanagan language referring to land-locked lake populations of sockeye salmon (Oncorhynchus nerka).  It may also refer to:

 Kokanee Range, a subrange of the Selkirk Mountains in British Columbia, Canada
 Kokanee salmon, a landlocked type of sockeye salmon
 Kokanee Creek Provincial Park, British Columbia, Canada
 Kokanee, British Columbia, a settlement on the West Arm of Kootenay Lake in British Columbia, Canada, at the mouth of the creek
 Kokanee Landing, a former steamboat landing and CPR station on the West Arm of Kootenay Lake in British Columbia, Canada
 Kokanee Point is located on the north shore of the West Arm of Kootenay Lake, to the west of Kokanee (settlement)
 Kokanee Narrows, a narrows on the West Arm of Kootenay Lake
 Kokanee Glacier Provincial Park, British Columbia, Canada, and associated placenames, including:
 Kokanee Glacier
 Kokanee Lake
 Kokanee Pass, a mountain pass located in Kokanee Glacier Park
 Kokanee Peak, a peak in the Kokanee Range located in Kokanee Glacier Park
 Kokanee beer, a popular beer in British Columbia, named for the Kokanee Glacier
 Kokanee Bay, a bay on the north side of Lac La Hache in the Cariboo region of British Columbia
 Kokanee Elementary School, a school in the Northshore School District, located in Bothell, King Country, Washington, United States
 Kokanee Campground, a locality in Fresno County, California
 Kokanee Picnic Area, a locality in Trinity County, California
 Kokanee Cove, a bay in Grand County, Colorado
 Kokanee Bend Fishing Access, a locality near Columbia Falls in Flathead County, Montana
 Lake Kokanee, a reservoir in Mason County, Washington